2016 Indian Banks data breach was reported in October 2016. It was estimated 3.2 million debit cards were compromised. Major Indian banks, among them SBI, HDFC Bank, ICICI, YES Bank and Axis Bank, were among the worst hit. The breach went undetected for months and was first detected after several banks reported fraudulent use of their customers’ cards in China and the United States, while these customers were in India. 

This resulted in one of the India's biggest card replacement drive in banking history. The biggest Indian bank State Bank of India announced the blocking and replacement of almost 600,000 debit cards.

An audit performed by SISA Information Security reports that the breach was due to malware injected into the payment gateway network of Hitachi Payment Systems.

See also

2016 Bangladesh Bank heist
List of cyber-attacks
Data breaches in India

References

Cyberattacks on banking industry
Banking in India
2016 in Indian economy
Data breaches
Cybercrime in India